The Essentials by The Cars is a compilation of hits released by WEA International in 2005.

Track listing

Personnel
 Elliot Easton – lead guitar, backing vocals
 Greg Hawkes – keyboards, backing vocals
 Ric Ocasek – rhythm guitar, lead vocals on 1, 2, 3, 4, 6, 7, 9, 11
 Benjamin Orr – bass guitar, lead vocals on 5, 8, 10, 12
 David Robinson – drums, percussion

References

The Cars compilation albums
Albums produced by Robert John "Mutt" Lange
Albums produced by Roy Thomas Baker
Albums produced by Mike Shipley
Albums produced by Ric Ocasek
2005 compilation albums